Donald Bruce Dawe  (15 February 1930 – 1 April 2020) was an Australian poet and academic.  Some critics consider him one of the most influential Australian poets of all time.

Dawe received numerous poetry awards in Australia and was named an Officer of the Order of Australia.  He taught literature in universities for over 30 years.

Dawe's poetry collection, Sometimes Gladness, sold over 100,000 copies in several printings.

Early life 
Bruce Dawe was born in 1930 in Fitzroy, Victoria. Dawe's paternal ancestors originated in Wyke Regis in Dorset, England.  The family moved to Australia in the mid-19th century.  His mother was of Lowland Scottish ancestry - she often recited Scottish poems from her childhood.

Dawe's parents came from farming families in Victoria.  Dawe was the only one in his family to complete primary school. His parents and four siblings always encouraged him to write poetry (his youngest sister also wrote poetry).

As a child, Dawe attended six schools.  At age 16, he dropped out of Northcote High School in Melbourne without completing his Leaving Certificate.  He then worked as a clerk, a labourer, a sales assistant, an office boy in an advertising agency and a copy boy at The Truth and The Sun News-Pictorial. Dawe also worked as a labourer in the Public Works Department, as a tailer-out in various Melbourne saw-mills and as a farm-hand in the Cann River valley.

In 1953, Dawe completed his adult matriculation by part-time study.  In 1954, he enrolled at Melbourne University on a teaching scholarship. However, at the end of 1954, he moved to Sydney, working as a labourer in a glass factory and later in a factory manufacturing batteries.  Also during 1954, Dawe converted to Catholicism.  In 1956, Dawe returned to Melbourne, where he worked as a postman for two years and as a self-employed gardener.

In 1959, Dawe joined the Royal Australian Air Force (RAAF), initially as a trainee telegraphist but remustered as an education assistant.  After completing his recruit training at RAAF Base Rathmines, he was posted to Ballarat, Victoria. On commencing duties as an education assistant, Dawe was posted to RAAF Base Wagga, Victoria Barracks Melbourne and Toowoomba, Queensland.

In 1966, Dawe was posted to Malaysia for six months.  During this posting, Dawe wrote the lyrics for the school song of the RAAF School on Penang.  This song was used until the school’s closing in 1988.

After leaving Malaysia, Dawe returned to Melbourne.

Teaching
Leaving the RAAF in 1968, Dawe began teaching at Downlands College, a Catholic boys college in Toowoomba, Queensland. After teaching English and history at the secondary level for two and a half years, he became a tertiary lecturer in English literature at the Darling Downs Institute of Advanced Education (DDIAE) in Toowoomba.

In 1971, Dawe was appointed as a lecturer at DDIAE.  In 1980, he became a senior lecturer at DDIAE.  In 1988, Dawe received the inaugural DDIAE Award for Excellence in Teaching.  In 1992, when DDIAE became the University of Southern Queensland (USQ), Dawe was appointed associate professor.

In 1993, Dawe retired from full-time teaching and was appointed as the first honorary professor of USQ. He then taught University of the Third Age classes.

Dawe would achieve four university degrees (BA, MLitt, MA, PhD), all completed by part-time study.

In 1999, Dawe endowed the Bruce Dawe National Poetry Prize of $2,500 to be awarded annually to an Australian poets. The endowment is held in trust by the University of Southern Queensland and administered by its Faculty of Arts, judged by the English Literature staff.

Poetry 
Dawe wrote poetry about ordinary people in modern Australia, their interests in cars, novels, films and other popular items.  He also wrote about abortion, environmental degradation, and the treatment of the Australian Aboriginal community.

In discussing Dawe's poetry, John Kinsella remarked"Always behind Dawe’s seemingly playful banter with us, his readers and public, is his commitment to sympathy and connection with the less empowered, the disenfranchised, downtrodden, neglected and exploited.

Personal life
On 27 January 1964, Dawe married Gloria Desley Blain,  Between December 1964 and July 1969, the couple had four children: Brian, twins Jamie and Katrina, and Melissa. Gloria died in 1997.

Dawe died in Caloundra, Queensland, on 1 April 2020, at age 90.

Awards
 1965 – Myer Poetry Prize
 1967 – Ampol Arts Award for Creative Literature
 1968 – Myer Poetry Prize
 1973 – Dame Mary Gilmore Medal
 1978 – Grace Leven Prize for Poetry
 1979 – Braille Book of the Year
 1980 – Patrick White Literary Award
 1984 – Christopher Brennan Award
 1990 – Paul Harris Fellowship of Rotary International
 1992 – Officer of the Order of Australia: "In recognition of service to Australian literature, particularly in the field of poetry"
 1996 – Alumni Award by the University of New England
 1997 – Philip Hodgins Memorial Medal at the Mildura Writers' Festival
 2000 – Australian Council for the Arts Emeritus Writers Award
 2001 – Centenary Medal for "distinguished service to the arts through poetry"

Bibliography

Poetry

Collections
 
 
 An Eye for a Tooth (Cheshire, 1968) 
 Beyond the Subdivisions : Poems (F. W. Cheshire, 1969)
 Heat-Wave. Melbourne (Sweeney Reed, 1970) 
 Condolences of the Season : Selected Poems (F. W. Cheshire, 1971)
 Just a Dugong at Twilight: Mainly Light Verse (F. W. Cheshire, 1975) 
 
 Selected Poems. (London, Longman, 1984)
 
 
 This Side of Silence : Poems 1987–1990 (Longman Cheshire, 1990)
 Mortal Instruments : Poems 1990–1995 (Longman, 1995)
 A Poet's People (South Melbourne, Addison Wesley Longman, 1998)
 The Headlong Traffic : Poems and Prose Monologues 1997 to 2002 (Longman, 2003)
 Towards a War: Twelve Reflections (Picaro Press, 2003) 
 Sometimes Gladness : Collected Poems, 1954–2005, 6th Edition (Longman Cheshire, 2006)
 Blind Spots (Picaro Press, 2013) 
 Kevin Almighty (Picaro Press, 2013)
 Border Security (UWA, 2016)

Poems

Critical studies, reviews and biography
 The Man down the Street, edited by Ian V. Hansen, Melbourne, V.A.T.E., 1972 
 Times and Seasons: An Introduction to Bruce Dawe, by Basil Shaw, Melbourne, Cheshire, 1974 
 Adjacent Worlds: A Literary Life of Bruce Dawe, by Ken Goodwin, Melbourne, Longman Cheshire, 1988 
 Bruce Dawe: Essays and Opinions, edited by K.L. Goodwin, Melbourne, Longman Cheshire, 1990 
 Bruce Dawe, by Peter Kuch, Oxford, Oxford University Press, 1995 .
 Attuned to Alien Moonlight: The Poetry of Bruce Dawe, by Dennis Haskell, St Lucia, UQP, 2002

References

External links 
 AustLit entry for Dawe. (retrieved 29 July 2013)
 Mildura Writer's Festival (Retrieved 4 August 2007)
 Cwisfa Lim, 2007, "Bruce Dawe and his world", Australia, CWX Publishers.
 Portrait of Bruce Dawe taken at Canberra Writers' Week 1995, by Virginia Wallace-Crabbe, National Library of Australia (Retrieved 10 August 2007)
 Brisbane Writers Festival – Bruce Dawe (Retrieved 26 August 2007)
 Australian Biography – Bruce Dawe, 1930 –2020 Poet (Retrieved 19 February 2022)
 Andrew Fuhrmann Reviews Bruce Dawe’s Plays in Verse: Kevin Almighty and Blind Spots
 Bruce Dawe at University of Southern Queensland

1930 births
2020 deaths
Australian male poets
Australian people of English descent
Australian poets
Officers of the Order of Australia
Patrick White Award winners
People educated at Northcote High School
Quadrant (magazine) people
Recipients of the Centenary Medal
Academic staff of the University of Southern Queensland
Converts to Roman Catholicism
Australian Roman Catholics
People from Fitzroy, Victoria
Writers from Melbourne